Roger Allen Leigh is a Plant Scientist. He is a former Professor of Botany, Cambridge University, where he was a fellow of Girton College. Between 2006 and 2010 he was head of school of Agriculture, Food & Wine at the University of Adelaide. He was then appointed as the Director of the Waite Research Institute at the University of Adelaide.

References

External links
Links to papers that he has written

British botanists
Fellows of Girton College, Cambridge
Living people
Academics of the University of Cambridge
Academic staff of the University of Adelaide
Year of birth missing (living people)
Professors of Botany (Cambridge)